Elvira Godeanu (1904–1991) was a Romanian stage actress. She also appeared in four films.

Selected filmography
 Povara (1928)
 A Lost Letter (1953)

References

Bibliography 
 Grid Modorcea. Istoria gândirii estetice românești de film. Editura Emin, 1997.

External links 
 

1904 births
1991 deaths
Actresses from Bucharest
Romanian film actresses
Romanian silent film actresses
Romanian stage actresses